"She Believes in Love Again" is a song written by Bruce Johnston for the American rock band The Beach Boys. It was released on their 1985 album The Beach Boys. The song was re-recorded during the That's Why God Made the Radio sessions but was not included on the final track list.

Musicians
Graham Broad – percussion
Stuart Gordon – violin, viola, cello
Al Jardine – vocals
Bruce Johnston – Kurzweil 250 synthesizer, lead vocal (verses)
Steve Levine – Fairlight CMI programming
Julian Lindsay – Yamaha DX1 synthesizer
Mike Love – vocals
Kenneth McGregor – trombone
Gary Moore – guitar, Synthaxe guitar synthesizer
Brian Wilson – vocals
Carl Wilson – lead vocal (choruses)

Chart positions

References 

1985 songs
1985 singles
The Beach Boys songs
Songs written by Bruce Johnston
Song recordings produced by Steve Levine